Thomas Harrison (17 August 1892 — April→June 1931 (aged 38)) born in Hanley, Stoke-on-Trent was an English professional fly/bantam/featherweight boxer of the 1900s, 1910s and 1920s  who won the National Sporting Club (NSC) (subsequently known as the British Boxing Board of Control (BBBofC)) British bantamweight title, British Empire bantamweight title, and European Boxing Union (EBU) bantamweight title, his professional fighting weight varied from , i.e. flyweight to , i.e. featherweight.

References

External links

1892 births
1931 deaths
Bantamweight boxers
English male boxers
Featherweight boxers
Flyweight boxers
Sportspeople from Hanley, Staffordshire